Superstar Josh TV is a 24-hour Odia satellite television channel, with its headquarters at Bhubaneswar, Odisha, India. It is promoted by Josh Television of Odisha.

The programmes of Superstar Josh are based on entertainment and infotainment. The aim of this channel is to entertain the viewers of Odisha with movies, music, mega serials, short stories, plays, video jockeys, astrological advice, beauty tips, recipes, tourist spots, and cultural programs, ceremonies, and events carried out in different parts of Odisha. The channel covers the latest happening of the Odia and Hindi film industries too. News of upcoming movies, albums, models, gossip of film personalities, growth of FM channels in Odisha and interviews with famous people of Odisha, is the prime content of this satellite TV channel.

Superstar Josh TV was established in 2009. This well known television channel is one such channel aired for the Odia-speaking viewers that caters to the interests of an entire family.

List of programmes
Alati
Bhakti Arghya
Dura Pruthibara Tara 
Geetanjali
Haso Hasao Life Banao
Josh Dance
Kutting Chai
Love Mail
Nua Swara
Pahili Phaguna
Phalguni
Celebrity talk shows/film gossip
Comedy shows
Daily astrology
Daily soaps/mega serials (coming soon)
Devotional programs
Reality shows
Romantic songs

See also
List of Odia-language television channels
Lists of television channels in India

External links

Official site

Television channels and stations established in 2009
Odia-language television channels
Television stations in Bhubaneswar
2009 establishments in Orissa